General elections were held in Mexico in 1892. Incumbent president Porfirio Díaz was re-elected with 99.9% of the vote.

Results

President

References

Mexico
General
Presidential elections in Mexico
Election and referendum articles with incomplete results